Sidsel Endresen (born 19 June 1952) is a Norwegian singer, composer, and actress. She was part of the Jon Eberson group. Since 1987, Endresen has pursued a successful solo career, recording for ECM.

Career 

Endresen was one of the most pronounced female jazz musicians in Norway in the beginning of the 21st century. She is a versatile artist, who likes to challenge her voice with new experimental forms and combination of jazz and other artistic expressions. Her work has moved from "fusion" and "chamber jazz" in the 1980s and 1990s, to improvisational "new" musical forms in the mid 1990s until today. She has also moved from larger formats to explore solo, duo and trio formats. The last 15 years have her work mainly been concentrated on the genre of free improvisation music, both as a performer and as composer.

Endresen studied English and Anthropology and stayed in the UK back in 1976, before settling in Oslo, where she started her artistic career.

She worked as a singer, composer and songwriter with soul group «Chipahua» (1979- ), with Jon Eberson Group (1980–87). With Eberson, she made a series of musically strong albums at the interface between jazz and rock that was highly popular and acclaimed by a growing audience. The result of this cooperation was five celebrated CDs, awarded two times the Spellemannprisen.

Endresen and Westerhus is followed by new experimental Norwegian musicians like Natalie Sandtorv and Torgeir Standal in The Jist duo.

Honors 
1981: Spellemannprisen in the class Jazz rock, for the album Jive Talking
1985: Spellemannprisen in the class Sector award, as composer/lyricist, for the album City Visions
1991: Gammleng-prisen Open class, for the album So I Write
1993: Radka Toneff Memorial Award
1998: Spellemannprisen Open class, together with Bugge Wesseltoft, for the album Duplex Ride
1998: Kongsberg Jazz Award
2000: Buddyprisen
2002: Spellemannprisen Open class, together with Bugge Wesseltoft, for the album Out here in there
2012: Spellemannprisen in the class Jazz, together with Stian Westerhus, for the album Didymoi Dreams

Discography

Solo albums 
1990: So I Write (ECM Records), with Nils Petter Molvær, Django Bates & Jon Christensen
1994: Exile (ECM Records)
2000: Undertow (Jazzland Recordings)
2006: One (Sofa Music)
2008: Punkt Live Remixes vol. 1: Sidsel Endresen 7 Jon Hassel (Punkt)

With Bugge Wesseltoft
1994: Nightsong (ACT)
1998: Duplex Ride (ACT)
2002: Out here in there (Jazzland Recordings)

With Christian Wallumrød & Helge Sten
2004: Merriwinkle (Jazzland Recordings)

With Stian Westerhus
2012: Didymoi Dreams (Rune Grammofon)
2014: Bonita (Rune Grammofon)

Collaborations 
Within Jon Eberson Group
1981: Jive Talking (CBS Records), awarded Spellemannprisen
1982: Polarities (CBS Records)
1984: City Visions (CBS Records)
1985: Stories (CBS Records), awarded Spellemannprisen
1987: Pigs and Poetry (CBS Records)

With Jon Balke
1998: Saturation (Jazzland Recordings/EmArcy)
2005: Statements (ECM Records), within Batagraf

With Nils Petter Molvaer
2001: Solid Ether (ECM Records)
2005: ER (Universal Records)
2006: an american compilation (Thirsty Ear)

With other projects
1995: Kullboksrytter (Curling Legs), with «Out To Lunch» & «Norwegian String Quartet»
2001: Different Rivers (ECM Records), with Trygve Seim
2002: ...The Rest Is Rumours (Curling Legs), with Pål Thowsen, Jon Eberson and Steinar Sønk Nickelsen feat. Endresen
2005: Sing Me Something (Fante Records), with «Ensemble du Verre»
2007: Crime Scenes (Punkt), at the Punkt Festival
2010: And Poppies from Kandahar (Samadhi Sound), with Jan Bang
2011: Ha! (Rune Grammofon), with Humcrush
2015: Debris in Lower Earth Orbit (Cusp Editions), with Twinkle³
2017: Hum (Confront Recordings), with Jan Bang
(See External Links, below, for in-depth discography)

References

External links 

 
 Sidsel Endresen Biography by Johs Bergh on Store Norske Leksikon
 Sidsel Endresen interview at underyourskin
 Sidsel Endresen Discography at discogs.com
Sidsel Endresen & Bugge Wesseltoft "Nightsong" - Deutsches Jazzfestival 1999 on YouTube

1952 births
Living people
Norwegian women jazz singers
Norwegian jazz singers
Avant-garde jazz musicians
Rune Grammofon artists
Musicians from Trondheim
ECM Records artists
Jazzland Recordings (1997) artists
ACT Music artists
Trondheim Jazz Orchestra members